The Bard's Tale II: The Destiny Knight is a fantasy role-playing video game created by Interplay Productions in 1986. It is the first sequel to The Bard's Tale, and the last game of the series that was designed and programmed by Michael Cranford.

The game features Dungeons & Dragons-style characters and follows in the footsteps of its predecessor, The Bard's Tale, also created by Michael Cranford. The Bard's Tale II takes place on a larger scale with an explorable wilderness, six cities, and multiple dungeons that give this game its dungeon crawl character. The game has new features such as casinos and banks, and introduces a new magic user called an Archmage, among other changes from the first game in the series.

Although it received mixed reviews upon release, The Bard's Tale II won the Origins Award for Best Fantasy or Science Fiction Computer Game of 1986.

In 2018, Krome Studios published a "remastered edition" as part of The Bard's Tale Remastered Trilogy.

Plot
A wizard named Saradon, having heard the news of your victory over the evil wizard Mangar (in The Bard's Tale), contacts you with dire news: "Lawless mercenaries from the neighboring kingdom of Lestradae ... under the guidance of an evil Archmage known as Lagoth Zanta" have stolen the Destiny Wand, that, through its power, "has maintained peace and prosperity for the last 700 years".

The player's manual provides the following overview of the game:

As The Destiny Knight, you must assemble a band of adventurers, track down the seven pieces of the Destiny Wand, and defeat the evil Archmage, Lagoth Zanta. Once you have defeated the evil Archmage and have managed to collect all seven fragments of the Destiny Wand, you must reforge the scepter into a unified whole, thus reunifying the Realm (and winning the game).

Where the previous game took place in only one city, The Bard's Tale II features six smaller towns and a large wilderness area.

To complete the game, players must collect segments of the Destiny Wand. The wizard Saradon has informed the party that they are hidden in seven separate locations "within a Snare of Death—a puzzle room that will require all the wisdom and cunning at your disposal in order for you to survive". While the segments can be acquired in any order, the dungeons feature progressively more dangerous monsters, which suggests how players should progress through the game:
Players begin in the city of Tangramayne, which features a four-level dungeon called the Dark Domain that is designed to get new, inexperienced parties started: By defeating the "Dark Lord" and returning a princess to the surface, novice characters receive a large experience point bonus. Powerful parties may elect to skip this starter mission.
The first segment of the Destiny Wand is located in the undead-infested Tombs, in the city of Ephesus. The key required for entry into Dargoth's Tower is also located here, on the second of three levels.
The second segment is in Fanskar's Fortress, located in the wilderness outside of the six cities. When Fanskar is defeated at the end of the first and only level, the party acquires the second segment.
Dargoth's Tower in the city of Philippi holds the third segment in its fifth level.
The fourth segment can be found in the Maze of Dread, which comprises three levels of sewers below the city of Thessalonica.
Next is Oscon's Fortress in Corinth, where the fifth segment can be had after negotiating the snare in its fourth level.
The Grey Crypt holds the next segment, and its entry is located in a building in the wilderness. It has only two levels, but magic cannot be used in it.
The seventh and final segment of the Destiny Wand is in the city of Colosse. In the northwest section of the city is a large rock called the Destiny Stone that can be entered through a crack.
To finish the game, an archmage in the party must take the seven segments to the Temple of Narn in the wilderness. The archmage reforges the segments into the Destiny Wand and becomes the Destiny Knight. But the game is not complete until Lagoth Zanta is defeated in the Sage's Hut.

Gameplay
According to Michael Bagnell, the game's audience is players who are happy to methodically plot out all 25 dungeons.

Changes from The Bard's Tale 
Although the "same interface and graphic display as the original game" (The Bard's Tale) are used in The Bard's Tale II, there are some noticeable changes. The world is a larger scale than The Bard's Tale. For example, instead of only one large city (Skara Brae), there are now six somewhat smaller towns: Colosse, Corinth, Ephesus, Philippi, Tangramayne, and Thessalonica. Players can explore a total of "25 dungeon levels" and the wilderness between cities. Michael R. Bagnall summarizes some of the other changes: A new combat system now features ranged combat, so you'll need long-range weapons or magic to hit foes up to 90 feet away. This offers tactical challenges not present in the original game. There are also lots of new spells and Bard songs, plus a variety of fresh monsters and a special character class, the ArchMage.

In addition, there are now "Death Snare Puzzle Rooms" that have real-time time limits in the seven dungeons. "Some puzzles involve typing in passwords learned in other areas of a maze, while others require you to follow specific patterns while traversing a dungeon. Few can be solved by pure logic alone."

Players can also now summon multiple creatures to join the party. Additional new features include banks (where players can store money that will be available even if the party is defeated and the game is restarted), and casinos where players can try their luck at a blackjack-like game (not implemented in the PC version).

Characters 
Characters can be imported from The Bard's Tale, Wizardry: Proving Grounds of the Mad Overlord (on Apple II versions), Ultima III: Exodus, or created from scratch and trained in Tangramayne's "starter maze".

Players can create a party of up to seven active characters; additional characters can be created and stored at the Adventurer's Guild in each city. They can be created as a human, elf, dwarf, hobbit, half-elf, half-orc, or gnome. Character classes available at the start are the warrior, paladin, rogue, bard, hunter, monk, conjurer, and magician. The sorcerer, wizard, and archmage classes are not available at the start. Character attributes (strength, intelligence, dexterity, constitution, and luck) are generated randomly during character creation (with values from 1–18) and affect gameplay. Empty character slots can also be filled with players or creatures through random encounters, spells, or the use of figurines.

Features 
The Bard's Tale II has a number of features that were seen in The Bard's Tale. There are "unmarked buildings" that contain little except a possible monster encounter or the entryway to a dungeon or castle. Each city within the game has an Adventurers' Guild where characters can be created, parties saved, and other actions performed.  At Garth's Equipment Shoppe players can buy, sell, or identify items. Parties can withdraw saved money from an account at Bedder's Bank for the Bold and spend it gambling at a casino, playing a game similar to blackjack. A stint at a casino can be followed by a celebration (or players can drown their sorrow over a loss) at a tavern where various drinks are available and the bartender provides advice—for a price. When ready, a party can venture into a dungeon to explore, fight monsters, and gain the experience needed to advance levels and become powerful enough to complete their quest. After a return to town, parties may need to make a trip to a temple where characters can be healed, restoring hit points, levels, life force, youth, flesh (for characters turned to stone), or life itself. Roscoe's Energy Emporium is another useful stop, where spell casters can pay an exorbitant fee to have spell units restored. And when ready, characters can visit the Review Board to advance levels and magic users can change character class.

Reception

The Bard's Tale II entered the gaming field strongly, winning the Origins Award for Best Fantasy or Science Fiction Computer Game of 1986. Later observations of the game were more mixed. For example, Scorpia of Computer Gaming World gave the game a mixed review. She noted several improvements over the original, such as an easier start and more easily recognizable buildings. However, the snares were considered excessively tedious, and the gameplay skewed heavily in favor of mages. Scorpia later called the game "without a doubt, the worst of the series", but the magazine's Charles Ardai called it "a fine sequel to Bard's Tale". RUN magazine reviewer Bob Guerra praised the game's new enemies and their corresponding animations and stated the game "offers an irresistible challenge to all fans of role-playing fantasies." Compute! stated that Bard's Tale II "lives up to its predecessor's excellent reputation". The magazine described the game as one "for the true adventure gamer. It is a very difficult and challenging game, and it requires great intestinal fortitude", and suggested that beginning adventurers avoid it.

The game was reviewed in 1987 in Dragon #120 by Hartley and Patricia Lesser in "The Role of Computers" column.  The reviewers suggested that "If The Bard's Tale was to your liking, then you're going to absolutely go crazy for The Bard's Tale II: The Destiny Knight." Michael Bagnall also stated in 1987 that due to the number of new features, "It is its own game, whose design is familiar enough that veterans can leap right in, yet with so many unique elements that it will challenge and enthrall them even more than the original."

Designers
Michael Cranford, a devout Christian, named five of the cities in the game after cities mentioned in the New Testament: Corinth, Colosse, Philippi, Ephesus, and Thessalonica. (He said in an interview that these were essentially placeholder names; he had fully expected them to be changed in the final game.) This was his last Bard's Tale game because he decided to go back to university to study philosophy and theology. Cranford had had a falling-out with Brian Fargo over his contract for The Bard's Tale; the final contract gave Cranford the full rights to the sequel game (The Bard's Tale II: The Destiny Knight), but he worked largely from home. Interplay would later create The Bard's Tale III: Thief of Fate without him.

Dave Warhol, who composed the music for The Bard's Tale II, founded his own game company in 1986, named Realtime Associates.

Rebecca Heineman (programmer of The Bard's Tale III) has said that the original name of this game was to be Tales of the Unknown - Volume II: The Archmage's Tale.

Remaster
During the 2015 Kickstarter campaign for the fourth main installment to the series, inXile partnered with Rebecca Heineman and her company Olde Sküül to remaster the original trilogy for modern personal computers running Mac OS and Microsoft Windows (instead of the emulated versions offered by inXile). After reaching an impasse in development, Olde Sküül and inXile agreed to transfer the project to Krome Studios.

The game was released as part of the remastered The Bard's Tale Trilogy on October 23, 2018. It was essentially rewritten from scratch for the remastered edition, keeping little if any of the original code. Graphics, sound and user interface were updated to modern standards, an authoritative gameplay ruleset was devised (where previously, certain game elements were different for the three games in the trilogy or even different ports of the same game), and some extra content was added to (slightly) expand on the story.

The remastered edition of the original trilogy was released  for Xbox One on August 13, 2019. This followed the acquisition of inXile Entertainment by Microsoft. The collection supports Xbox Play Anywhere.

See also
 Silversword

References

Bibliography

External links

The Bard's Tale Compendium
Bard's Tale Online
The Bard's Tale II at GameBase64 - with links to the files and music for the Commodore 64

1986 video games
Amiga games
Apple II games
Apple IIGS games
Commodore 64 games
DOS games
Fantasy video games
First-person party-based dungeon crawler video games
Games commercially released with DOSBox
Interplay Entertainment games
NEC PC-9801 games
Nintendo Entertainment System games
Origins Award winners
Role-playing video games
Video game sequels
Video games developed in Australia
Xbox Cloud Gaming games
Single-player video games
Video games developed in the United States